Raymond William Thorburn (15 November 1930 – 30 January 1986) was an Australian politician. He was a member of the Australian Labor Party (ALP) and held the New South Wales seat of Cook in the House of Representatives from 1972 to 1975. He was an electrical engineer by profession.

Early life
Thorburn was born on 15 November 1930 in Sutherland, New South Wales. He completed a certificate in electrical engineering at Sydney Technical College and subsequently worked as an engineering officer.

Politics
Thorburn served on the Sutherland Shire Council from 1964 to 1973, including as shire president from 1971 to 1972. He was also vice-president of the Cronulla branch of the ALP from 1956 to 1970.

At the 1972 federal election, Thorburn defeated the incumbent Liberal MP Don Dobie in the seat of Cook. He was re-elected in 1974 but lost his seat to Dobie in the ALP's landslide defeat at the 1975 election. He made three unsuccessful attempts to reclaim the seat from Dobie, and remains the only member of the ALP to have held Cook.

Thorburn was a member of the House Standing Committee on Aboriginal Affairs from 1973 to 1975 and was a parliamentary representative on the Australian Institute of Aboriginal Studies.

Personal life
Thorburn had two children with his wife Joan. He died on 30 January 1986 at the age of 55.

References

1930 births
1986 deaths
Australian Labor Party members of the Parliament of Australia
Members of the Australian House of Representatives for Cook
Members of the Australian House of Representatives
People from the Sutherland Shire
20th-century Australian politicians
Mayors of places in New South Wales